Plymouth by-election may refer to:

 1868 Plymouth by-election
 1870 Plymouth by-election
 1871 Plymouth by-election
 1886 Plymouth by-election
 1900 Plymouth by-election
 1937 Plymouth Drake by-election